The 1942–43 Ranji Trophy was the ninth season of the Ranji Trophy. Baroda won their first title defeating Hyderabad in the final. Only 13 teams took part, the lowest in the history of the Ranji Trophy. Teams like Bombay and Madras skipped the competition.

Highlights
 Alimuddin who made his debut for Rajputana in the semifinal against Baroda was officially only 12 years and 43 days old. This makes him one of the youngest first-class cricketers.
 Vijay Hazare took his 100th Ranji wicket in the final. He had already completed 1000 runs in the 1939–40 final.

Zonal Matches

North Zone

West Zone

East Zone

South Zone

Inter-Zonal Knockout Matches

Final

Scorecards and averages
Cricketarchive

References

External links

1943 in Indian cricket
Indian domestic cricket competitions